BioWare is a Canadian video game developer based in Edmonton, Alberta. It was founded in 1995 by Ray Muzyka, Greg Zeschuk, and Augustine Yip. They signed a partnership with American publisher Interplay Productions to get investment and development resources for their first game Shattered Steel, a mech simulation action game released in 1996. The game was a modest success, but BioWare's second title, Baldur's Gate (1998), achieved overwhelming critical praise and defined the company's future direction. A role-playing video game (RPG) based on Dungeons & Dragons, Baldur's Gate sold more than two million copies and became the most successful Dungeons & Dragons game ever at the time. Two years later, the studio released an acclaimed sequel Baldur's Gate II: Shadows of Amn, which along with the use of BioWare game engines in RPGs such as Planescape: Torment (1999) and Icewind Dale (2000) helped propel the studio to the forefront of the computer RPG genre. Interplay was suffering financially by the early 2000s, so BioWare collaborated with publisher Infogrames to release their next Dungeons & Dragon-based RPG Neverwinter Nights (2002).

BioWare was given the opportunity to work on another popular intellectual property, Star Wars, when LucasArts approached them at the turn of the millennium. Star Wars: Knights of the Old Republic released first on Microsoft's Xbox video game console in 2003. While it was not BioWare's first console game, it helped the studio break into the console market since Microsoft Game Studios wanted to partner with them on console exclusive titles, such as Jade Empire (2005) and Mass Effect (2007). In March  2006, BioWare expanded their operations and opened a new studio in Austin, Texas, to helm the development of a massively multiplayer online role-playing game (MMORPG). In October 2007, American publisher Electronic Arts (EA) announced that it had acquired BioWare. Under EA, BioWare established the fantasy RPG series Dragon Age, continued to release games in their science fiction RPG series Mass Effect, and opened a new studio in Montreal. They also revisited the Star Wars franchise with BioWare Austin's MMORPG Star Wars: The Old Republic (2011).

In the early 2010s, EA restructured and rebranded several of its other studios under the BioWare label, including Mythic Entertainment and Victory Games which respectively became BioWare Mythic and BioWare Victory. New games from these studios were announced as BioWare projects, but they were cancelled and the studios shut down in the following years. In September 2012, co-founders Muzyka and Zeschuk announced their retirement and departure from BioWare. Following the release of Mass Effect: Andromeda in 2017, BioWare Montreal was merged with EA's Motive Studios.

Games 
All games developed by BioWare Edmonton, except where noted.

References

BioWare